WFXD (103.3 FM, 103-FXD) is a radio station broadcasting a country music format in Marquette, Michigan.

The station began broadcasting in 1974 at 100.1 FM as WUUN, a live-assist Top 40/adult contemporary music station known as "Stereo 100". In 1985, the station moved to its current 103.3 frequency and became WRUP "U.P. 103", programming a CHR format. The station's slogan and calls meant "We're UP on the U.P.!"  1

WRUP changed in 1990 to the WFXD calls and a satellite-fed oldies format, which continued for almost a decade until the station went country. Originally the station used the on-air identifier "B103" under its country format, even though it never changed its calls from WFXD; it later identified as FOX 103, WFXD. In the summer of 2010, the station dropped all satellite-fed portions of its format and rebranded as "The Country Extreme." On Monday, January 30, 2012 the station launched a brand new and improved playlist. The playlist includes the biggest hits in country from the 80's, 90's, and today. Eric Scott (Eric Tasson) is the program director/music director for WFXD, and serves as the stations morning show host. The station is currently a currents-based station.

As of March 2013, the station has dropped the "Country Extreme" slogan and now goes by "103 FXD."

On-Air Talent includes:
Elmer Aho ("American Country Gold with Elmer Aho"),  
Eric Scott (Mornings "Mornings with Eric Scott"), 
Dennis Harold (Middays "On the Job with Dennis"), 
Adam Carpenter (Afternoons "The Outdoor Show"), 
Lane Dawson (Evenings "The Country Scoop with Lane Dawson"), 
Major Discount (Todd Noordyk "UPBargains.com Shopping Show")

Shows include:
Mornings on FXD, 
American Country Gold with Elmer Aho, 
American Country Countdown, 
American Christian Music Review, 
The Road with Charlie Cook,
The Final Lap with Kerry Murphy,
The Classic Country Spin,
The FXD Concert Connection,
UPBargains.com Shopping Show

Translators

Notes:

Sources

Michiguide.com - WFXD History

External links
WFXD.com - Official Site

FXD
Country radio stations in the United States
Radio stations established in 1970
1970 establishments in Michigan